Daniel Cremers (born 1971) is a German computer scientist, Professor of Informatics and Mathematics and Chair of Computer Vision & Artificial Intelligence at the Technische Universität München. His research foci are computer vision, mathematical image, partial differential equations, convex and combinatorial optimization, machine learning and statistical inference.

Career
Cremers received a bachelor's degree in mathematics (1994) and Physics (1994), and later a master's degree in Theoretical Physics (1997) from the University of Heidelberg. He obtained a PhD in Computer Science from the University of Mannheim in 2002. He was a postdoctoral researcher at  UCLA. He was associate professor at the University of Bonn from 2005 until 2009.

He received a Starting Grant (2009), and a Consolidator Grant (2015) by the European Research Council. On March 1, 2016, Cremers received the Gottfried Wilhelm Leibniz Prize for having "brought the field of image processing and pattern recognition an important step closer to its goal of reproducing the abilities of human vision with camera systems and computers."

Selected publications

References

Gottfried Wilhelm Leibniz Prize winners
Academic staff of the Technical University of Munich
Living people
1971 births